Mitromorpha monodi is a species of sea snail, a marine gastropod mollusk in the family Mitromorphidae.

Description
The length of the shell attains 4.9 mm.

Distribution
This marine species occurs off Senegal.

References

 Knudsen, J. 1956. Marine prosobranchs of tropical West Africa (Stenoglossa). Atlantide Report No. 4. Scientific results of the Danish Expedition to the coasts of tropical West Africa 1945–46. Copenhagen, pp. 7–110, pis. 1–4.

External links
 Specimen at MNHN, Paris
 

monodi
Gastropods described in 1956